Cunaxa is a genus of predatory mites in the family Cunaxidae. There are at least 50 described species in Cunaxa.

Species

References

Further reading

 
 
 

Trombidiformes
Trombidiformes genera
Taxa named by Carl von Heyden